Still Movement with Hymn is a composition for piano quartet by the American composer Aaron Jay Kernis.  It was composed in 1993 and was given its world premiere at Princeton University on November 11, 1993.  It is dedicated to the memory of the composer Stephen Albert, who died unexpectedly in 1992.  The piece was a finalist for the 1994 Pulitzer Prize for Music.

Composition
Still Movement with Hymn has a duration of roughly 25 minutes and is composed in a single slow movement divided into three sections.  Kernis described the composition in the score program note, writing:

Instrumentation
The work is scored for a piano quartet consisting of violin, viola, cello, and piano.

Reception
Reviewing a recording of the work, the music critic Joshua Kosman of the San Francisco Chronicle called it "a potent elegy for piano and strings" and wrote, "The score itself, with its anguished climaxes and interludes of serene mourning, is exquisite."

References

Compositions by Aaron Jay Kernis
1993 compositions
Compositions for piano quartet
Music with dedications